Sadeyaka, is a village in Eskipazar, Karabük, Turkey. It is the administrative name for four nearby villages; Saraycık, Şeyhler (Şıhlar), Kısaç and Sadeyaka (Yakaköy).

History 

The village was administered by Çankırı until 1995, when Karabük became a province. Drinking water infrastructe has been completed in 2008.

Culture 
It has local food such as cizleme, kaz bandırması and arpa-buğday gavurgası. Miyane helvası and nişasta helvası (White Helva) is a tradition on religious holidays. There is a türbe in Şeyhler village built for Sheikh Ali Semerkandi. His grave is in Çamlıdere, Ankara, but there is a water well called "Sığırcık Suyu" dedicated to him.

Geography 
Village center is 51 km away from Karabük, and 16 km from Eskipazar. It has oceanic climate.

Local governance 
The muhtars with their election dates are:
 2009: Rıza Akbaş
 1999, 2004: Ali Demirtaş (2 terms)
 1994: Hüsamettin Tepe
 1989: Sadet Yazı
 1984: Adil Akbaşoğlu

References

External links 
 Sadeyaka at Yerelnet

Populated places in Karabük Province